Muctar "Pusong" Yunos Junaid (LKS-KAM) is a Filipino politician and current mayor of Tabuan-Lasa in Basilan (2010–13).

References

Lakas–CMD politicians
Mayors of places in Basilan
Living people
Year of birth missing (living people)
Place of birth missing (living people)
Filipino Muslims